The Savoia-Marchetti S.72 was an Italian three-engine transport monoplane designed and built by Savoia-Marchetti as an enlarged and strengthened version of the earlier S.71. The S.72 was a three-engine, high-wing cantilever monoplane with a fixed tailwheel landing gear. Designed as a heavy bomber, the prototype was first flown in 1934 powered by three 410 kW (550 hp) Alfa Romeo licence-built Bristol Pegasus radial engines.

Operational history
The Regia Aeronautica showed no interest in the aircraft as a heavy bomber and the prototype was used as a VIP transport. After being demonstrated in China in 1935 the prototype was handed over to Generalissimo Chiang Kai-shek as a gift. Six more aircraft were ordered by the Chinese and assembled in China. It is presumed that all the aircraft were destroyed in Japanese air raids in 1937.

Specifications

See also

References

External links

 "The World's Race to Arms" Popular Mechanics, December 1935 - various rare photos 

S.72
1930s Italian airliners
Trimotors
High-wing aircraft
Aircraft first flown in 1934